Vespinitocris tavakiliani is a species of beetle in the family Cerambycidae. It was described by Jérôme Sudre and Pierre Téocchi in 2005. It is known from the Ivory Coast.

References

Endemic fauna of Ivory Coast
Saperdini
Beetles described in 2005